The 2010 United States Curling Men's Championships were held in Kalamazoo, Michigan from March 6 to 13. The 54th edition of the United States Curling Men's Championships was held alongside the 2010 Women's Nationals. Teams could qualify through three different methods. John Shuster's team qualified through the first method by virtue of being the defending champions. Next, teams could qualify by finishing in the top spots of their respective regional championships. The final method of qualification came in a Nationals Playdown where the teams that placed between 2nd and 4th in their regional qualifications compete for the final three spots.

On Friday, February 27, 2010 it was revealed on the USA Network broadcast that John Shuster's team had elected to withdraw from the National Championships. The team skipped by Wes Johnson replaced them.

The winning team represented the United States at the 2010 Capital One World Men's Curling Championship.

Teams
The teams are listed as follows:

Round robin standings

Tiebreakers
Thursday, March 11, 8:00 pm

Playoffs

1 vs. 2 game
Friday, March 12, 12:00 pm

3 vs. 4 game
Friday, March 12, 12:00 pm

Semifinal
Friday, March 12, 8:00 pm

Championship final
Saturday, March 13, 3:00 pm

References

United States Men's Curling Championship
United States National Curling Championships
Curling in Michigan